, meaning "battleship island"  in Japanese, is the nickname of several islands:
 Hashima Island (Japanese: Hashima),  Nagasaki Prefecture, Japan
 Mitsukejima, Suzu, Ishikawa, Japan